Chatmongkol Rueangthanarot (born 9 May 2002) is a Thai professional footballer who plays as a left back or a defensive midfielder for Thai League 1 club Chonburi and the Thailand national team.

Club career

Chonburi
Chatmongkol learned to play football in the youth team of Chonburi. There, he signed his first professional contract in 2020. However, from January to the end of June 2020, he was loaned to third division side Banbueng. At the beginning of July 2020, he returned to the Sharks after the loan. He made his league debut for Chonburi on 13 September 2020, playing the entire match against Trat.

International career
On 15 October 2021, Rueangthanarot was called up to the Thailand under-23 for the 2022 AFC U-23 Asian Cup qualification phase.

International goals

Thailand U-16

Honours
Chonburi
 Thai FA Cup : Runner-up 2020–21

International
Thailand
 AFF Championship (1): 2022

References

External links
 
 

2002 births
Living people
Chatmongkol Rueangthanarot
Chatmongkol Rueangthanarot
Chatmongkol Rueangthanarot
Association football defenders
Chatmongkol Rueangthanarot
Chatmongkol Rueangthanarot
Chatmongkol Rueangthanarot
Chatmongkol Rueangthanarot